Karin Hindsbo (born 1974) is a Danish art historian and museum director. She is the current director of the National Museum of Art, Architecture and Design in Oslo, Norway.

Hindsbo graduated as cand.mag. in art history and history of ideas from the Aarhus University in 2002. She was assigned with Institut for Samtidskunst in Copenhagen from 2002 to 2005, and chaired Den Frie Udstillingsbygning from 2006 to 2011. She edited the art magazine Øjeblikket from 2003 to 2011. From 2003 to 2006 she also lectured at the University of Copenhagen.

She was appointed director of the National Museum of Art, Architecture and Design in Oslo from 2017.

References

1974 births
Living people
Danish art historians
Aarhus University alumni
Directors of museums in Norway
Women museum directors
Danish expatriates in Norway
Women art historians
Danish women historians